The Lions FC is a Seychelles-based football club, currently playing in the Seychelles Second League.

The team is based in Cascade, Seychelles in Mahe island but is made up of players from around the main island of Seychelles, Mahe.

Stadium
Currently, the team plays at the 10,000 capacity Stade Linité.

References

External links
Soccerway

Football clubs in Seychelles